Miss Venezuela 1994 was 41st Miss Venezuela pageant, was held in Caracas, Venezuela on September 2, 1994, after weeks of events.  The winner of the pageant was Denyse Floreano, Miss Costa Oriental.

The pageant was broadcast live on Venevision from the Teresa Carreño Cultural Complex in Caracas. At the conclusion of the final night of competition, outgoing titleholder Minorka Mercado, crowned Denyse Floreano of Costa Oriental as the new Miss Venezuela.

Results
Miss Venezuela 1994 - Denyse Floreano (Miss Costa Oriental)
Miss World Venezuela 1994 - Irene Ferreira (Miss Miranda) 
Miss Venezuela International 1994 - Ana María Amorer (Miss Apure)

The runners-up were:
1st runner-up - Katerina Ivanoff (Miss Distrito Federal)
2nd runner-up - Yoseany Finol (Miss Zulia)
3rd runner-up - Auxiliadora González (Miss Nueva Esparta)
4th runner-up - Solangel Pastor (Miss Trujillo)

Special awards
 Miss Photogenic (voted by press reporters) - Kariana Ochoa (Miss Amazonas)
 Miss Congeniality - Astrid Núñez (Miss Monagas)
 Miss Elegance - Ana María Amorer (Miss Apure)
 Most Beautiful Eyes - Katerina Ivanoff (Miss Distrito Federal)
 Best Smile - Annie López (Miss Cojedes)

Delegates
The Miss Venezuela 1994 delegates are:

 Miss Amazonas - Kariana Yaneth Ochoa Charandziuk
 Miss Anzoátegui - Cibelys María Ruiz Patiño
 Miss Apure - Ana María Amorer Guerrero
 Miss Aragua - Suzette Tedaldi Agudelo
 Miss Barinas - Mildred Carolina Sarli Andrades
 Miss Bolívar - Alessandrina Herrera Bejarano
 Miss Carabobo - Eva Carolina Vich Lozada
 Miss Cojedes - Ana Emilia "Annie" López Bello
 Miss Costa Oriental - Denyse del Carmen Floreano Camargo
 Miss Delta Amacuro - Maria Carolina Chapellín Bigott
 Miss Dependencias Federales - Rosangel Querales Alvarado
 Miss Distrito Federal - Gladys Katerina Ivanoff Peña
 Miss Falcón - Coralie Josephine Larson Cotua
 Miss Guárico - Maria Gabriela Zambrano Párraga
 Miss Lara - Maria Fabiola Colmenares Rodríguez
 Miss Mérida - Rossiel Bello Rodríguez
 Miss Miranda - Irene Esther Ferreira Izquierdo
 Miss Monagas - Astrid Núñez Hall
 Miss Nueva Esparta - Maria Auxiliadora González Guzmán
 Miss Península Goajira - Patricia Negrón González
 Miss Portuguesa - Tibisay Trovisco Andión
 Miss Sucre - Sandra Vidal Conde
 Miss Táchira - Carolina Castillo Sulyan
 Miss Trujillo - Solangel Carolina Pastor
 Miss Yaracuy - Lody Attie Attie
 Miss Zulia - Yoseany Finol Léidenz

External links
Miss Venezuela official website

1994 beauty pageants
1994 in Venezuela